Lowlife is a 2017 American black comedy crime thriller film co-written and directed by Ryan Prows and stars Nicki Micheaux. It had its world premiere at the 2017 Fantasia International Film Festival.

Plot

The film is set in an unspecified poverty stricken neighborhood in Los Angeles and is split into four intermingling narratives:

Monsters:

El Monstruo is a disgraced luchador descended from a legendary line of Mexican luchadores, who each take up the mask of El Monstruo, the "protector of the downtrodden". The current El Monstruo has fallen on hard times and works as a henchmen for local crime lord Teddy "Bear" Haynes. With the help of the corrupt ICE Agent Fowler, Teddy kidnaps illegal immigrants for the prostitution and organ harvesting ring run out of the basement of his taco shack. One day when El Monstruo escorts a customer to one of Teddy's sex slaves, the girl appears to believe he is there to save her, but he shamefully replies "I am not that El Monstruo". El Monstruo lives in contempt and hopes that his unborn son, carried by Teddy's adopted daughter Kaylee, will be able to bring honour back to the legacy he disgraced.

When El Monstruo fails to get Teddy's money back from a man, Teddy fires him and implies that he's going to have them both killed. Kaylee quickly begins to pack but El Monstruo refuses to believe that his "Jefe Teddy" would betray them. When Kaylee threatens to hurt their baby if El Monstruo won't let her leave, he falls into a rage and wakes up to find Kaylee gone and their house a ruin.

He prays to his ancestors when he is attacked by Fowler. He falls into a rage and wakes outside a run down motel, holding Fowler's bloody hand, still holding the gun. He uses the motels pay phone to ask Teddy's help in finding Kaylee. He goes outside to pray to his ancestors to guide him to his wife and son where he is confronted by the Motel's manager Crystal with a shotgun.

Fiends:

Crystal and Dan are recovering drug addicts who manage a run down motel. They are the biological parents of Kaylee and sold her to Teddy, believing she would have a better life. Instead, unbeknownst to them, Teddy prostituted her before El Monstruo "saved her". Dan needs a kidney transplant and Teddy arrives one day saying that Kaylee has offered one of hers. Crystal reluctantly agrees and pays Teddy the agreed amount.

When Crystal begins to have concerns, she drives to Teddy's house, sees Kaylee in the garden and realizes she's pregnant. She calls Teddy to say it's off but he feigns ignorance and implies that it's too late for her to back out anyway. As she hangs up, she sees two men, including one with a swastika tattoo on his face, force Kaylee into a car. Crystal flees back to the motel and finds that Dan has committed suicide with a shotgun after discovering Crystal was buying Kaylee's kidney. Guilt stricken, Crystal takes the shotgun with her behind the motel counter. Just then the men who kidnapped Kaylee arrive and get a room, a shocked Crystal gives them the key before El Monstruo arrives and uses the payphone. However, El Monstruo mistakenly uses the intercom function, instead of leaving a message Crystal is able to hear that he is also looking for Kaylee. She loads the shotgun and confronts him in the parking lot. She asks if he is looking for Kaylee, and when he answers "yes" she tells him the number of the room where the men took her. El Monstruo rushes to the door and she follows. They kick the door in and a shot is heard.

Thugs:

Ex-convict turned accountant Keith arrives at California State Prison to pick up his friend Randy who is being released after an 11 year stretch. Keith, an African-America, is disgusted to find that while in prison, Randy had a nazi swastika tattoo over his entire face. Randy denies being a nazi, and tells Keith that it was something he was forced to do in order to stay alive in prison. He explains that prison has given him an understanding of different cultures and he has learned fluent Spanish. Keith was Teddy's accountant and was embezzling money from him before Teddy discovered the theft. Teddy gives the pair an ultimatum; they must kidnap Kaylee to settle the debt, or Teddy will kill Randy's wife and children.

The pair arrive at Teddy's house and kidnap Kaylee. She explains that Teddy will kill them even if they do bring her to him. Randy wants to go through with it, fearing Teddy's wrath, but Keith is unsure. They decide to stop at a nearby motel, the same from earlier in the film. After they get a room, Kaylee begins giving birth. As the pair argue about what do to, the door bursts open and El Monstruo and Crystal enter.

Criminals:

Teddy drives to Crystal's motel and enters room 101 to find Kaylee and the others helping her. Teddy orders El Monstruo to bring him Kaylee. Having learned about the legend of El Monstruo, Randy appeals to Monstruo in his native tongue. El Monstruo, honoured that someone has treated him as an equal, turns on Teddy. However, Teddy manages to kidnap Kaylee and keep the group at bay with an assault rifle. After he drives off, the group run out and attempt to follow him when they realize Keith has been shot in the arm. The group follow in Crystal's van. They discuss what to do with Keith, who is dying of blood loss. Keith implores that they rescue the girl as he dies. Arriving at Teddy's taco shack, El Monstruo leads the trio into the basement. They find Kaylee and the baby, now born, alive and unharmed in a meat fridge. When El Monstruo holds his son in his arms, he inexplicably runs out of the building exclaiming "The legacy is all!". Randy and Crystal try to escape with Kaylee but are shot at by Teddy. They barricade themselves in to buy time.

Outside, El Monstruo walks the street holding his baby in his arms, he notices more corrupt ICE agents entering the restaurant. He has second thoughts and arrives to save the others just as the agents open the fridge. Randy attacks Teddy while Kaylee and Crystal flee, but they are stopped by Agent Fowler. He chokes Crystal and almost kills her before he is hit by Kaylee which allows Crystal to slit his throat. Meanwhile, Teddy knocks out Randy and shoots El Monstruo, who has killed the ICE agents, and he appears to die. Having been severely wounded, Teddy lies screaming threats and obscenities at Kaylee and Crystal while clumsily loading his pistol. El Monstruo recovers enough to drag himself over to Teddy and punches his head to pulp using the power of his legendary rage.

Moments later, Randy awakes to find a mortally wounded El Monstruo. He promises to look after the mask until his son can take up the mantle, but El Monstruo does not want the mask to burden his sons life as it did his. Randy implores El Monstruo not to allow the lineage to be broken, but Monstruo dies and asks Randy to free the prostitutes. Randy himself takes up the mask, it perfectly covers his swastika tattoo. He frees the prostitutes and vows to lead them back to "our native land" where he says they will flourish.  Crystal and Kaylee sit together in the van. Kaylee asks if Crystal is her mother, Crystal doesn't reply but gives Kaylee a tearful, telling glance. They hug each other and Kaylee remarks "I'm going to need some help".

Cast
 Nicki Micheaux as Crystal
 Ricardo Adam Zarate as El Monstruo
 Jon Oswald as Randy
 Shaye Ogbonna as Keith
 Santana Dempsey as Kaylee
 Mark Burnham as Teddy "Bear" Haynes
 King Orba as Dan

Reception
On the review aggregator website Rotten Tomatoes, the film holds an approval rating of 91%, based on 35 reviews, and an average rating of 7.4/10. The website's consensus reads, "A darkly funny crime chronicle, Lowlife presents a Los Angeles teeming with memorable characters and propulsive style." On Metacritic, the film has a weighted average score of 66 out of 100, based on 7 critics, indicating "generally favorable reviews".

Dennis Harvey of Variety wrote that it "Nicely calibrates a twisty course between straight crime melodrama and black comedy, one that has cult-following potential among adventurous genre fans." John DeFore from The Hollywood Reporter wrote that it's "A captivating feature debut despite some missteps, it flashes back to a time when every other filmmaking newcomer wanted to be Quentin Tarantino; surprisingly, it does not provoke the weary eye-rolling that greeted so many of those films."

References

External links
 
 
 

2017 films
2017 crime thriller films
2017 crime drama films
2017 thriller drama films
American crime thriller films
American crime drama films
American thriller drama films
American independent films
American comedy horror films
2010s English-language films
2010s American films